UMG Philippines Inc. is a record label based in the Philippines and served as its regional branch of the multinational music corporation, Universal Music Group. Formerly known as MCA Music, the record label previously retained the now-discontinued MCA name on legal purposes because of a trademark dispute with an unrelated label known as Universal Records, which preempted the rights to the word "Universal" for recorded music in the Philippines. However, the company adopted the moniker "MCA/Universal", much like Universal Pictures' home video unit from 1990 to 1997, to simplify identification, even though no formal "Universal" branding is exercised. Despite the naming, the label is known outside the Philippines as Universal Music Philippines.

The record label then changed to its current name on November 3, 2021.

History
PolyCosmic Records was formed in 1993 as a joint venture between PolyGram Music Group (Universal Music Group's predecessor, which has 30% of the company's stocks) and a consortium of Philippine businessmen including Dr. James G. Dy (founding chairman of Dyna Products, Inc., which was the local distributor of PolyGram) and Cosmic Records, a company founded in 1992 by Ramon Chuaying.

Universal Records — which would later be involved in a domestic trademark dispute with UMG — had the distribution rights to Polygram; and Chuaying was its first CEO. 

In 1998, PolyGram N.V. was purchased by Seagram's  and was merged into MCA Inc., and PolyGram Music Group was merged with MCA Music Entertainment to become Universal Music Group. After the merger, PolyCosmic Records was reincorporated as MCA Music Inc. (Philippines). In 2006, Ricky Ilacad was named the managing director and CEO.

MCA Music has a partnership with Smart Communications, Inc. to make music downloads available to phone users via music service Spinnr.

In 2020, UMG formally appointed Sindikato Management founder and former Sony Music Philippines A&R consultant Enzo Valdez as managing director, replacing Ilacad. The same year, UMG launched Def Jam Philippines and Island Records Philippines. In 2021, UMG signed a distribution agreement with Off the Record, a local independent label owned by Ilacad.

On November 3, 2021, after 23 years as MCA Music Inc., the record label was renamed as UMG Philippines Inc. On the same day, UMG Philippines formally launched its digital consumer-facing brand known as UMUSIC Philippines (umusic.ph).

On July 8, 2022, UMG launched its third label, Republic Records Philippines.

Artists (past and present)

UMG Philippines (formerly MCA Music)

Def Jam Philippines

Island Records Philippines

Republic Records Philippines

Off the Record (distribution only)

See also
 Universal Music Group
 Universal Records (Philippines)
 Dyna Music
 PolyEast Records
 Sony Music Philippines
 Warner Music Philippines
 List of Universal Music Group labels

References

External links

Philippine record labels
Universal Music Group
Companies based in Mandaluyong
Record labels established in 1993
1993 establishments in the Philippines